Zalmay Mamozy Khalilzad (born March 22, 1951) is an Afghan-American diplomat and foreign policy expert. Khalilzad was U.S. Special Representative for Afghanistan Reconciliation from September 2018 to October 2021. Khailzad was appointed by President George W. Bush to serve as United States Ambassador to the United Nations, serving in the role from 2007 to 2009. Khalilzad was the highest ranking Muslim-American in government at the time he left the position. Prior to this, Khalilzad served in the Bush administration as Ambassador to Afghanistan from 2004 to 2005 and Ambassador to Iraq from 2005 to 2007.

Raised in the Afghan capital of Kabul, Khalilzad came to the United States as a high school exchange student, and later received his doctorate at the University of Chicago.  During the Reagan Administration, Khalilzad served in the Department of State, where he advised on the U.S. response to the Soviet–Afghan War. Khalilzad later served as a counselor at the Center for Strategic and International Studies (CSIS) and as president of Gryphon Partners and Khalilzad Associates, an international business consulting firm based in Washington, D.C.

Khalilzad was rumored to be a potential candidate in the 2014 Afghan presidential election, but ultimately declined to run. In 2017, he was considered for Secretary of State by President Donald Trump. Khalilzad was appointed by Trump to serve as Special Representative for Afghanistan Reconciliation on September 5, 2018, remaining in the position under President Joe Biden until October 18, 2021. In this position, Khalilzad helped broker the US–Taliban deal and facilitating the final United States withdrawal from Afghanistan.

Awards

Khalilzad's service in the government has been recognized by three different Secretaries of Defense: Secretary of Defense Gates awarded Ambassador Khalilzad the Department of Defense medal for outstanding public service for his service in Iraq. Secretary Rumsfeld awarded Ambassador Khalilzad the Department of Defense medal for outstanding public service for his work in Afghanistan. And Secretary of Defense Cheney awarded Ambassador Khalilzad the Department of Defense medal for outstanding public service for his time as Assistant Deputy Under Secretary of Defense for Policy Planning from 1991 to 1992.

Khalilzad has also been awarded the highest national medals by the Presidents of Afghanistan, Georgia and Kosovo. In Afghanistan he was awarded the King Amanullah Medal in 2005. The Georgian president awarded Khalilzad the Order of the Golden Fleece in 2016. Kosovo's president awarded Khalilzad the Order of Independence in 2017.

Early life and education
Khalilzad was born in Mazar-i-Sharif, Afghanistan, and grew up in the country's capital, Kabul. He is an ethnic Pashtun from the Noorzai tribe. Khalilzad began his education at the public Ghazi Lycée school in Kabul.

He first spent time in the United States as a high school exchange student with AFS Intercultural Programs in Ceres, California. Later, he attained his bachelor's and his master's degrees from the American University of Beirut, in Lebanon. Khalilzad received his doctorate at the University of Chicago where he studied closely with Albert Wohlstetter, a prominent nuclear deterrence thinker and strategist. Wohlstetter provided Khalilzad with contacts within the government and RAND. Khalilzad has contributed at least 28 papers to RAND Corporation.

Early career

From 1979 to 1989, Khalilzad worked as an Assistant Professor of Political Science at Columbia University's School of International and Public Affairs. During that time, he worked closely with Zbigniew Brzezinski, the Carter administration's architect of Operation Cyclone to support the Afghan mujahideen, who resisted the Soviet Union's invasion of Afghanistan.

In 1984, Khalilzad accepted a one-year Council on Foreign Relations fellowship to join the US State Department, where he was an adviser to the Near East and South Asia Bureau, headed by Richard W. Murphy.

From 1985 to 1989, Khalilzad served in the Reagan administration, as a senior State Department official, advising on the Soviet–Afghan War, after the Soviet invasion. During that time, he was a member of the Policy Planning Staff and the State Department's Special Adviser on Afghanistan to Undersecretary of State Michael H. Armacost. In that role, he developed and guided the international program to promote the merits of a mujahideen-led Afghanistan ousting the Soviet occupation. From 1990 to 1992, Khalilzad served under President George H. W. Bush in the US Defense Department, as Deputy Undersecretary for Policy Planning.

Between 1993 and 2000, Khalilzad was the director of the Strategy, Doctrine, and Force Structure at the RAND Corporation. During that time, he helped found RAND's Center for Middle Eastern Studies as well as "Strategic Appraisal," a RAND periodical. He also authored several influential monographs, including "The United States and a Rising China" and "From Containment to Global Leadership? America and the World After the Cold War." At RAND, he also had a brief stint in consulting for Cambridge Energy Research Associates, which was conducting a risk analysis for Unocal, now part of Chevron, for a proposed 1400 km (890 mi), $2-billion, 622 m³/s (22,000 ft³/s) Trans-Afghanistan gas pipeline project, which would have extended from Turkmenistan to Afghanistan and then proceeded to Pakistan.

Support for U.S. global leadership
Khalilzad also wrote several articles on the subject of the value of U.S. global leadership in the mid-1990s. The specific scenarios for conflict that he envisioned if a decline in American power occurred have made his writings extremely popular in competitive high school and college policy debate, particularly his writing that links the loss of US hegemony to global instability.
Khalilzad was a signatory of the letter from members of the Project for the New American Century to President Bill Clinton sent on January 26, 1998. It called for Clinton's help in "removing Saddam Hussein and his regime from power" by using "a full complement of diplomatic, political and military efforts."

Views

American politics 
Khalilzad has been described as a "lifelong Republican", though he did not support Donald Trump's 2016 presidential campaign.

United States' role in the world 
Khalilzad has sometimes been characterized as a neoconservative, with one profile in The Guardian in 2006 characterizing him as "combin[ing] the commitment of an American neocon with the cultural sensitivity of his Islamic background". At times, Khalilzad has embraced the label, authoring an article titled "The Neoconservative Case for Negotiating With Iran" in Politico magazine in 2006.

In 1995, Khalilzad articulated his views regarding the appropriate role of the United States in the Post-Cold War period:"The United States should be willing to use force if necessary for this purpose. There are currently two regions whose control by a hostile power could pose a global challenge: East Asia and Europe. The Persian Gulf is critically important for a different reason—its oil resources are vital for the world economy. In the long term, the relative importance of various regions can change. A region that is critical to American interests now might become less important, while some other region might gain in importance."Regarding U.S. military preeminence, Khalilzad argued in favor of maintaining a sufficiently strong military to be able to embark in "two major regional contingencies nearly simultaneously":"For the foreseeable future, this means having the capability for fighting two major regional contingencies nearly simultaneously, e.g., Korea and the Gulf. The United States should also acquire increased capabilities for occasional intervention in lesser regional conflicts, such as humanitarian relief operations, and for countering weapons of mass destruction and ballistic and cruise missiles. For the longer term, it should consider moving toward sizing its forces to be able to defeat the plausible military challenges to critical American interests that might be posed by the two next most powerful military forces in the world—which are not allied with the United States."

Afghanistan

Taliban 
In June 2001, Khalilzad argued that the "United States must act now to weaken the Taliban and stem the spread of Talibanism". In a letter, Khalilzad endorsed the following policies to weaken the Taliban's control over Afghanistan:

 "change the balance of power by offering assistance to the foes of the Taliban;
 oppose the Taliban ideology--giving air time over the Voice of America to Taliban opponents and moderate Islamic leaders;
 press Pakistan to withdraw its support;
 aid victims of the Taliban;
 support moderate Afghans through helping to convene a grand assembly to select a broad transitional government; and
 elevate the importance of Afghanistan at home."

Peace Process in Afghanistan 
In June 2009, Khalilzad stated the following at a UC Berkeley Event:"I believe and I've told president Karzai few month ago, because he is talking a lot about reconciliation, which is conceptually an absolute necessity, every war must end, but circumstance must be created for that wish to be successful. I've told him [to] get your house in order first, get the corruption issue dealt with, get governance improved, get services improved, then people would say `ahaa ... i want to be on this side, it looks like it is a better side, the side that is producing resolve.' But if they see your judges are corrupt, and your governors are not providing any services, initially people would think `why should I die for this, I'm going to become neutral`, or worse if the other side is providing more security, let's say, it [sic] will be even more difficult."- June 17, 2009. UC Berkeley Events

"If the sanctuary could be put at risk, I think the prospect of Reconciliation will improve."

North Korea 
In a published 1993 paper, he advocated for "trade sanctions" against North Korea, "enhancing U.S. and South Korean military readiness", and "direct military attacks"."Use of force by a U.S.—allied coalition has better prospects for achieving the U.S. objective, either by setting back the program or by producing a more compliant North Korea—depending on how much and how effectively the force is applied. However, given the risk of triggering a second Korean war, it is unclear whether the South Koreans or Japanese could be induced to agree."

George W. Bush administration (2001-2009)

U.S. Ambassador to Afghanistan 

In 2001, President George W. Bush asked Khalilzad to head the Bush-Cheney transition team for the Department of Defense, and Khalilzad briefly served as Counselor to Secretary of Defense Donald Rumsfeld. In May 2001, National Security Adviser Condoleezza Rice announced Khalilzad's appointment as Special Assistant to the President and Senior Director for Southwest Asia, Near East, and North African Affairs at the US National Security Council. In December 2002, Bush appointed Khalilzad to the position of Ambassador at Large for Free Iraqis with the task of coordinating "preparations for a post-Saddam Hussein Iraq."

After the terrorist attacks of 9/11, Bush came to rely on Khalilzad's Afghanistan expertise. Khalilzad was involved in the early stages of planning to overthrow the Taliban and on December 31, 2001, he was selected as Bush's Special Presidential Envoy for Afghanistan. He served in that position until November 2003, when he was appointed to serve as US ambassador to Afghanistan. Khalilzad held that position from November 2003 until June 2005.

During that time, he oversaw the drafting of the constitution of Afghanistan, was involved with the country's first elections and helped to organize the first meeting of Afghanistan's Loya Jirga (traditional grand assembly). At the June 2002 Loya Jirga to select the Head of State,  representatives of the US convinced the former king of Afghanistan, 87-year-old Zahir Shah, to withdraw from consideration even though a majority of Loya Jirga delegates supported him. That move angered Pashtuns, who were concerned with the disproportionate power of the Northern Alliance in the Karzai government. During Khalilzad's tenure as ambassador, the new Afghan president, Hamid Karzai, consulted closely with him on a regular basis about political decisions, and the two dined together regularly. In 2004 and 2005, he was also involved in helping with the establishment of the American University of Afghanistan (AUAF), which is the first American-style higher learning educational institution in Afghanistan. In 2016, the Friends of the American University of Afghanistan  presented him with the International Public Service Award.

U.S. Ambassador to Iraq 

Khalilzad began his job as the U.S. Ambassador to Iraq on June 21, 2005. He was credited for helping negotiate compromises which allowed the ratification of the Constitution of Iraq in October 2005. Khalilzad also worked to ensure that the December 2005 elections ran smoothly and played a substantial role in forming the first post-Saddam government. Khalilzad also helped establish the American University of Iraq, in Sulaimaniya, and sits on its board of regents.

In comparison to his predecessors, Paul Bremer and John Negroponte, in Baghdad, Khalilzad was considered a success as an ambassador and credited with bringing a cultural sophistication and human touch to the job that helped connect with Iraqis.

Khalilzad was one of the first high-level administration officials to warn that sectarian violence was overtaking the insurgency as the top threat to Iraq's stability. After the Al Askari Mosque bombing, in February 2006, he warned that spreading sectarian violence might lead to civil war and possibly to even a broader conflict, involving neighboring countries. Khalilzad sought political solutions to the problem of sectarianism, and in particular, he worked to integrate the balance of power between Iraq's three main ethnic groups to head off growing the growing Sunni violence.

Khalilzad's term as ambassador ended on March 26, 2007. He was replaced by Ryan Crocker, a career diplomat and former U.S. ambassador to Pakistan.

U.S. Ambassador to the United Nations 

On February 12, 2007, the White House submitted Khalilzad's nomination to the Senate to become the U.S. ambassador to the United Nations. He was unanimously confirmed by the Democratic-controlled US Senate on March 29, 2007. That marked a strong contrast to Khalilzad's predecessor, John R. Bolton, whose often-controversial rhetoric caused him to fail to be confirmed by the Senate but obtained a recess appointment.

Colleagues at the UN noted that Khalilzad has a different style from Bolton and was more conciliatory.

In November 2007, Khalilzad charged that Iran was helping the insurgent groups in Afghanistan and Iraq. He also told the media, soon after the International Atomic Energy Agency's release of its report on Iran, that the Iranian government was clearly going ahead with its nuclear program. Khalilzad explained that the US would try to pass another resolution in the Security Council, under Chapter 7, to impose additional sanctions against Iran.

In August 2008, he urged the Security Council to "take urgent action" and to "condemn Russia's military assault on the sovereign state of Georgia".  He also stated that Russian Foreign Minister Sergey Lavrov had told US Secretary of State Rice that Georgian President Mikheil Saakashvili "must go."

Private sector (2009–2018) 
From 2009 to 2018, Khalilzad served as the President of Khalilzad Associates, LLC, an "international advisory firm that serves clients at the nexus of commerce and public policies, helping global businesses navigate the most promising and challenging international markets." Khalilzad Associates and its parent company, Gryphon Capital Partners, have, as clients, international and US companies that interested mainly in doing business in Iraq and Afghanistan. According to Khalilzad, they include companies in the sectors of energy, construction, education, and infrastructure.

Khalilzad served as a Counselor at the Center for Strategic International Studies (CSIS) and sits on the Boards of the National Endowment for Democracy (NED), America Abroad Media (AAM), the RAND Corporation's Middle East Studies Center, the Atlantic Council, the American University of Iraq in Suleymania (AUIS), The American University of Kurdistan (AUK), and the American University of Afghanistan (AUAF).

On September 9, 2014, a news items appeared in the Austrian media, stating that Khalilzad was being investigated by authorities in Austria for suspected money laundering, and that his wife's accounts had been frozen. On September 10, the Austrian court made known that the case had been dismissed and the accounts had been ordered unfrozen a week earlier, on September 3. The leak was the result of court documents having been discarded unshredded in the general trash, and then found by scavenging bloggers.

In 2015, he donated over $100,000 to the Atlantic Council, a US think tank.

Khalilzad's political autobiography, The Envoy: From Kabul to the White House, My Journey Through a Turbulent World, was published by St. Martin's Press in 2016.

Envoy for Afghan Reconciliation and aftermath

In September 2018, Secretary of State Mike Pompeo named Khalilzad as the Special Representative for Afghanistan Reconciliation, a newly created envoy with the mission of securing a peaceful resolution to the conflict in Afghanistan. As of March 2021, he has continued in this role under the new administration of Joe Biden.

On May 18, 2021, at a U.S. House of Representatives Foreign Affairs Committee hearing on U.S. policy in Afghanistan, Khalilzad downplayed the prospect of a swift Taliban takeover when U.S. forces leave saying, "If they [Taliban] pursue, in my judgment, a military victory, it will result in a long war, because Afghan security forces will fight, other Afghans will fight, neighbors will come to support different forces."

He later added at that same hearing, "I personally believe that the statements that the [Afghan] forces will disintegrate, and the Talibs will take over in short order are mistaken. The real choices that the Afghans will face is between a long war and negotiated settlement." Despite this statement, the 2021 Taliban offensive culminated in a swift Taliban takeover and the dissolution of the Afghan National Army. Ahmad Wali Massoud, a Taliban adversary who was also critical of the government of Afghanistan President Ashraf Ghani, accused Khalizad of playing a role in orchestrating the Taliban's return to power in an interview which was published in TRT World on September 21, 2021. Massoud argued that the Taliban did not have the military capacity to retake Kabul without great assistance and also cast suspicion on growing U.S. efforts to use the Taliban to fight the terrorist group ISIS-K.

In 2022, Politico reported that Khalilzad attended a dinner with Russian ambassador to the United States Anatoly Antonov amid the 2022 Ukraine War. Khalilzad reportedly stated “we need an agreement” to end the war in Ukraine, which Antonov was said to have agreed with. Dimitri Simes, president and CEO of the Center for the National Interest, also attended the dinner, where he pitched the idea of starting a new media outlet in Moscow, an idea Khalilzad said could be "very lucrative".

Personal life
Khalilzad is an ethnic Pashtun. Khalilzad's wife is author and political analyst Cheryl Benard. They met in 1972 while they were both students at the American University of Beirut. They have two children.

References

External links

Zalmay Khalilzad on United States Department of State

Articles
 Losing the Moment? The United States and the World After the Cold War 
The Washington Post – Afghan Roots Keep Adviser Firmly in the Inner Circle
US Mission to the UN – United States Ambassadors to the United Nations
Current Biography August 2006 cover story
The New Yorker – American Viceroy 
RFE/RL interview with Zalmay Khalilzad (May 18, 2007)
Profile: Khalilzad, The Center for Cooperative Research
Video: Khalilzad discusses Iraq, Afghanistan and the Middle East
The Long Shadow of a Neocon
What to Read on Afghan Politics 2010

|-

|-

1951 births
Living people
20th-century Muslims
21st-century American politicians
21st-century Muslims
Afghan emigrants to the United States
Afghan Muslims
Ambassadors of the United States to Afghanistan
Ambassadors of the United States to Iraq
American people of Pashtun descent
American Sunni Muslims
American University of Beirut alumni
Columbia University faculty
George W. Bush administration personnel
Obama administration cabinet members
Pashtun people
People from Mazar-i-Sharif
Permanent Representatives of the United States to the United Nations
RAND Corporation people
Reagan administration personnel
United States National Security Council staffers
University of Chicago alumni
Washington, D.C., Republicans
21st-century American diplomats